Miguel Adolfo Gerardo Zaldívar Larraín (September 13, 1943 – February 27, 2013) was a Chilean politician and lawyer. He was senator for Aisén and from March 2008 until his death in February 2013 he had been President of the Chilean Senate. He was an historic member of the Christian Democratic Party, leading its right-wing faction until his expulsion from the political party in December 2007.

Zaldívar was married to María Alicia Larraín Shaux and had six children. He was the brother of former President of the Senate of Chile and Interior Minister Andrés Zaldívar.

Life and career

Early life
Zaldívar received secondary formation at the Instituto de Humanidades Luis Campino. Then, he went to university at the law faculty of the Catholic University in Chile, which he concluded in 1967. As a partner at the law firm "Irureta, Zaldivar, Briones y Hernández", he worked in his profession until he finished his studies.

Political life
In 1965 Zaldívar became the university party leader of the Christian Democrat Party (PDC), and from 1970 to 1972 he occupied the post of national counselor for youth of this party. In the following year he became the national leader of the lawyers of the PDC, and filled this position until 1980. He was a co-founder of the Chilean Commission of Human Rights.

From 1985 to 1988 Zaldívar was president of the Forum of Political Integration of Chile and Argentina. From 1983 to 1989 he was part of the fiscal commission of the PDC. Then from 1983 to 1990 he worked as national counselor of the PDC, then he became premier national vice-president.

In the elections of December 1993 Zaldívar was elected senator, and formed the senate's mining commission. He went on to form the commission on national defense and the commission of maritime interests, fishing and aquaculture. From 2002 to 2006 he was president of the PDC.

Party expulsion
In early 2006, after he lost the presidency of the PDC to Soledad Alvear, Zaldívar became a vocal critic of the Chilean economic system and voiced his disappointment with the government's "unwillingness" to amend it. He frequently came into conflict with Alvear and in August 2007 the Christian Democrat Party's Supreme Tribunal chastised him for his criticisms. Additionally, he was one of the harshest critics of the Transantiago public transport system, created under the leadership of the Concertación coalition to which the Christian Democrats belonged. In November 2007, Zaldívar, together with senators from the Alliance for Chile and independents Fernando Flores and Carlos Bianchi, voted against continued funding for the Transantiago, against the wishes of his party's leadership. Alvear and her followers accused Zaldívar of "siding with the right" and requested his expulsion from the party. In December, the party leadership formally presented the expulsion request to the Supreme Tribunal of the party, on the basis of his decision to ignore the party wishes on the Transantiago funding bill and for Zaldívar's harsh criticisms of the leadership's actions regarding corruption. The Tribunal finally decided to expel Zaldívar on December 27, 2007. On March 12, 2008 he became President of the Senate with the votes from the right-wing Alliance for Chile.

References

External links

Official site

1943 births
2013 deaths
Presidents of the Senate of Chile
Members of the Senate of Chile
Ambassadors of Chile to Argentina
Pontifical Catholic University of Chile alumni
Christian Democratic Party (Chile) politicians
Independent Regionalist Party politicians
Deaths from cancer in Chile
Deaths from pancreatic cancer
Zaldivar